is a 2014 Japanese animated romantic-comedy film based on a light novel with a same name from The World's Greatest First Love manga series written and illustrated by Shungiku Nakamura. The film is directed and written by Chiaki Kon, and produced by Studio Deen. The film was released in Japan on March 15, 2014.

The film was licensed by Funimation, and streamed on its website on September 21, 2021.

Plot
Takafumi Yokozawa wakes up in a stranger's house. He is unable to recall what happened the night before, until he sees his co-worker, Zen Kirishima coming out of the shower. After learning that Kirishima had paid his bar tab the night before and had some type of blackmail photo of him, Yokozawa resigns to becoming Kirishima's servant per his request.

After learning about Kirishima's past and his job as a single father, Yokozawa attempts to come to terms with his broken heart. After confessing each other's feelings, Yokozawa and Kirishima decides how they're going to spend Valentine's Day.

Voice cast
Kenyu Horiuchi as Takafumi Yokozawa
Noboru Sōgetsu as Zen Kirishima
Yui Horie as Hiyori Kirishima
Takashi Kondō as Ritsu Onodera
Katsuyuki Konishi as Matsumune Takano
Shinnosuke Tachibana as Chiaki Yoshino
Yuichi Nakamura as Yoshiyuki Hatori

Production
In September 2012, it was announced that The World's Greatest First Love anime series was receiving a film adaptation, based on The Case of Takafumi Yokozawa light novel. On the following year, it was announced that series director Chiaki Kon will direct the film at Studio Deen, with Yoko Kikuchi designing the characters for the film.

Release
The film was released in theaters in Japan on March 15, 2014. The film was later re-released in Japan on October 22, 2017. Funimation licensed the film, and was released in the United States on its website on September 21, 2021.

References

External links
 

2010s Japanese films
2014 anime films
Animated films based on manga
Studio Deen
Films directed by Chiaki Kon
2014 LGBT-related films
LGBT-related animated films
Japanese LGBT-related films

ja:世界一初恋#横澤隆史の場合